The 2017–18 season was Hereford's third season since forming as a phoenix club after the demise of Hereford United in 2014. The club competed in the Southern Football League Premier Division for the first time following their promotion from the Southern Football League Division One South & West in the previous season.

First-team squad 
As of 28 April 2018

Transfers

Transfers in

Transfers out

Loans in

Loans out

Pre-season

Competitions

Overview

Southern Football League Premier Division

League table

Results summary

Matches

FA Cup 

Hereford entered the competition in the first qualifying round.

FA Trophy 

Hereford entered the competition in the first qualifying round.

HFA County Challenge Cup 

Source: Bulls News

Squad statistics 
 As of match played 28 April 2018

Goals

Club awards

End-of-season awards

References 

Hereford F.C.